was a Japanese female artistic gymnast and part of the national team.

She participated at the 2008 Summer Olympics. She also competed at world championships, including the 2009 World Artistic Gymnastics Championships in London, Great Britain.

References

External links
Miki Uemura at Sports Reference
http://intlgymnast.com/index.php?option=com_content&view=article&id=319:japan-returns-two-for-2008&catid=18:olympic-news&Itemid=248
http://www.alamy.com/stock-photo-koko-tsurumi-miki-uemura-japanese-gymnast-about-to-perform-on-beam-27920737.html
http://www.gettyimages.com/photos/miki-uemura?excludenudity=true&sort=mostpopular&mediatype=photography&phrase=miki%20uemura&family=editorial

1986 births
Living people
Japanese female artistic gymnasts
Sportspeople from Wakayama Prefecture
Gymnasts at the 2008 Summer Olympics
Gymnasts at the 2002 Asian Games
Gymnasts at the 2006 Asian Games
Olympic gymnasts of Japan
Asian Games medalists in gymnastics
Asian Games silver medalists for Japan
Asian Games bronze medalists for Japan
Medalists at the 2002 Asian Games
Medalists at the 2006 Asian Games
People from Arida, Wakayama
21st-century Japanese women